Divinity: Original Sin II is a role-playing video game developed and published by Larian Studios. The sequel to 2014's Divinity: Original Sin, it was released for Windows in September 2017. The game was a critical and commercial success, selling over a million copies in two months and being cited as one of the best role-playing games of all time, with praise given to its combat complexity and interactivity.

A remastered version called Divinity: Original Sin II Extended Edition was released for Windows, PlayStation 4 and  Xbox One in August 2018, for macOS in January 2019, Nintendo Switch in September 2019, and iPadOS in May 2021.

Players who owned the original version for Windows received the remaster as a free update. In addition to the updated graphics and performance improvements, the new game had rewritten dialogue and included new areas, fights, and a new Story difficulty level which made the games combat easier for novice players.

Gameplay
As with Divinity: Original Sin, players can play solo or with up to three others in their party.  Several pre-made characters with backstories are available to the player. Players are also able to  create a custom character and choose their stats, race, gender, and origin story at the start of the game. Unlike in the original game, players are also given the possibility to create an undead character of one of the available races. They can recruit up to three companions to assist them, although mods in the Steam Workshop exist that increase the maximum number of party companions. All companions are fully playable, and will potentially have different interactions with the environment and NPCs than does the player character. Players are able to split up and individually control their party members, leading to potentially complex battle tactics and role-playing opportunities. The game features both online and local multiplayer modes, both competitive and cooperative. A skill crafting system allows players to mix and change their skills. The game also features a competitive multiplayer mode wherein players are divided into two different teams battling within an arena map.

Plot

The game is set on the fantasy world of Rivellon, centuries after Divinity: Original Sin. Living beings on Rivellon have a form of energy known as Source, and individuals called Sourcerers can manipulate Source to cast enhanced spells or improve their physical combat abilities. The Seven Gods of Rivellon had given up a portion of their collective Source power and infused it into a person, Lucian, known as the Divine, who used his powers to hold back the Void. However, Lucian died before the start of the game, which weakened the Veil between the Void and Rivellon, and monstrous creatures of the Void, guided by the God King, their dark deity, have begun to invade Rivellon. These Voidwoken are drawn to the use of Source, and so an organization called the Divine Order is persecuting Sourcerers.

At the start of the game, the player character, a Sourcerer, is captured by the Divine Order and sent to an island prison known as Fort Joy. On the way there, a gigantic Kraken Voidwoken attacks and sinks the ship, but the player character is saved by a mysterious voice, who calls the player "Godwoken".

On Fort Joy, the Godwoken witnesses the brutal regime of the Divine Order, led by Lucian's son Alexandar and his enforcer Dallis. Sourcerers at Fort Joy are "purged" of their Source, turning them into mindless husks. The Godwoken also learns of a tyrannical Sourcerer king called Braccus Rex, who had died around 1000 years ago. The Godwoken escapes the fortress and visits the Hall of Echoes, the realm of the Seven Gods, where they encounter one of the Seven. The God explains that they had rescued the Godwoken on the ship, and that the weakened Veil has allowed the Void to enter Rivellon, draining the Gods' powers. The God urges the Godwoken to become the next Divine and hold back the Void. The Godwoken then escapes from the island.

The Godwoken sails to the continent of Reaper's Coast. There, they expand their Source powers. Encountering their God again, they are directed to the Well of Ascension, where they can absorb enough Source to become Divine. The Godwoken also learns that Dallis has excavated the Aeteran, an artifact able to purge Source from the entire world. Additionally, the Godwoken meets Aetera, an immortal being who claims to be a member of a race called Eternals, the original inhabitants of Rivellon. She explains that the Seven Gods were Eternals who craved power and betrayed the other Eternals, banishing them to the Void. The Seven then created the mortal races of Rivellon and maintain their own power by draining Source from them.

The Godwoken sails to the Nameless Isle where the Well of Ascension is located. There, they learn that the Eternals in the Void have become the Voidwoken, and the Eternals' former king has become the God King. The God King and the Voidwoken intend to return to Rivellon and reclaim it as theirs. The Godwoken reaches the Well but before they can become Divine, Dallis appears and steals all the Source from Well with the Aeteran, destroying it in the process. The Godwoken's failure enrages their God, who attacks them, but ends up being killed by them in self-defense.

The Godwoken pursues Dallis to the Tomb of Lucian, in the city of Arx, and finds Lucian alive within. Lucian reveals that he faked his death and hid in his tomb and that he, not the Void, has been draining Source from the Seven. Lucian intends to purge all Source from Rivellon and use it to permanently seal the Veil, to bring peace to the world. Dallis, secretly an Eternal, has been aiding Lucian. To this end, she has resurrected Braccus Rex, who has been serving Dallis as Vredeman.

Braccus Rex breaks free of Dallis's control and summons the Kraken to attack the Godwoken, Lucian, and Dallis. After Braccus Rex is defeated, the ending varies depending on player choice: the Godwoken can become the next Divine, purge all Source from Rivellon, release the Source and the powers of Divinity to the world, or allow the God King to return to Rivellon, restoring Eternal rule.

Development
The game was first announced on 12 August 2015. It was announced that the game would launch on Kickstarter on 26 August. The game reached its $500,000 goal on Kickstarter in less than 12 hours. Some of the stretch goals were reached before they were even announced.  In the end, all of the available stretch goals were met, with over 2 million dollars collected in total. Larian announced that the company decided to head to Kickstarter again because they wanted the opinions from the community when developing the game, as well as allowing them to further expand the vision they originally had for this game. The game's music was composed by Borislav Slavov, who replaced former series composer, Kirill Pokrovsky, who died in 2015.

The game was released for early access for Windows on 15 September 2016, and was fully released on 14 September 2017. Despite a power outage in Ghent, the location of Larian's development studio, on the day of launch, the game was successfully released and had a concurrent player count of 75,000 within a week, becoming one of the most played games on Steam at the time. In addition to a free "enhanced edition" update for owners of the original game, it was also released on PlayStation 4 and Xbox One by Bandai Namco Entertainment on 31 August 2018. It was also released for macOS on 31 January 2019, and for the Nintendo Switch on 4 September 2019.

Reception 

Divinity: Original Sin II received "universal acclaim", according to review aggregator Metacritic. Multiple critics and publications considered the game to be one of the best role-playing games (RPGs) of all time. Rick Lane of Eurogamer considered it a "masterpiece", thinking it would be many years before he could play another RPG that was even close to being "that rich with choice and charisma". Adam Smith of Rock, Paper, Shotgun thought that few games allowed players to take part in better tales than Original Sin II. Leif Johnson of IGN highly praised the stories, quests, tactical combat, and replayability, calling it one of the all-time greats of the RPG genre. GameSpot gave it a perfect 10/10 score, becoming only the 14th game in the publication's history to achieve that. Mike Williams of US Gamer called it the "pinnacle" of the computer role-playing game (CRPG) genre, praising its characters, role-playing options, environments, and combat. Janine Hawkins of Polygon was less positive than most, calling it "stunningly ambitious", but that it failed to "pull all its pieces together".

A month after release, the game sold over 700,000 copies, with over a million sold by November 2017. The game was nominated for "Best Role-Playing Game" at The Game Awards 2017, and for "Best Narrative Design" and "Best Adventure/Role-Playing Game" at the Titanium Awards; it was also nominated for "Game of the Year" and "Best Story", and was a runner-up for best PC game and best RPG at IGN's Best of 2017 Awards. The game also received a nomination for "Best PC Game" at Destructoids Game of the Year Awards 2017. The staff of PC Gamer voted it as their game of the year for 2017, where it was also nominated for the "Best Co-Op Game" award. The staff of GameSpot voted it as their fifth best, while Eurogamer ranked it 11th on their list of the "Top 50 Games of 2017". Readers and staff of Game Informer gave it the "Best PC Exclusive", "Best Turn-Based Combat", and "Best Side-Quests" awards, and also placed it second for the "Best Co-op Multiplayer" award. The game was also nominated for "Role-Playing Game of the Year" at the D.I.C.E. Awards, for "Game Engineering" and "Game, Franchise Role Playing" at the NAVGTR Awards, and for "Best Sound Design for an Indie Game" and "Best Music for an Indie Game" at the Game Audio Network Guild Awards; and won the award for "Multiplayer" at the 14th British Academy Games Awards. It was also nominated for "Music Design" and "Writing or Narrative Design" at the 2018 Develop Awards. The PlayStation 4 and Xbox One versions were nominated for "Best RPG" at the 2018 Game Critics Awards, and won the award for "Best Role-Playing Game" at Gamescom 2018, whereas its other nomination was for "Best Strategy Game".

References

External links
 

2017 video games
Crowdfunded video games
Fantasy video games
Kickstarter-funded video games
Role-playing video games
Tactical role-playing video games
Video game sequels
Video games developed in Belgium
Video games featuring protagonists of selectable gender
Windows games
Early access video games
Video games with Steam Workshop support
Multiplayer and single-player video games
PlayStation 4 games
Xbox One games
MacOS games
Nintendo Switch games
Bandai Namco games
Open-world video games
Dark fantasy role-playing video games
British Academy Games Award for Multiplayer winners